Thomas Henry  (26 October 1734 – 18 June 1816) was a surgeon and apothecary. He was a Fellow of the Royal Society of London, and also the father of William Henry, the chemist who formulated Henry's Law.

Background
Henry was born in Wrexham, Wales training as a surgeon-apothecary in that town. He later moved to Manchester in England.

Career
He invented a process for preparing magnesia alba in 1771 and became known as "Magnesia" Henry. He was a founder and afterwards president of the Manchester Literary and Philosophical Society.

In 1776, Thomas Henry speculated tongue in cheek that Joseph Priestley’s newly discovered dephlogisticated air (now called oxygen) might become “as fashionable as French wine at the fashionable taverns”.  He did not expect, however, that tavern goers would “relish calling for a bottle of Air, instead of Claret”.

After Priestley's publication of a method to make carbonated water, Henry manufactured "artificial Pyrmont and Seltzer waters" for sale in the late 1770s, imitating the famous sparkling mineral waters, e.g. from Selters.

In 1786, he was elected to the American Philosophical Society.

References

External links

Fellows of the Royal Society
British surgeons
1734 births
1816 deaths
People from Wrexham
Welsh apothecaries
Manchester Literary and Philosophical Society
Members of the American Philosophical Society